Kirpichnoye is a rural locality (a settlement) in Vokhtozhskoye Rural Settlement, Gryazovetsky District, Vologda Oblast, Russia. The population was 13 as of 2002.

Geography 
Kirpichnoye is located 91 km northeast of Gryazovets (the district's administrative centre) by road. Vosya is the nearest rural locality.

References 

Rural localities in Gryazovetsky District